The Catholic Church of St Osmund, Barnes is a Roman Catholic church in Castelnau, Barnes, London SW13. Its parish priest is  Reverend Monsignor Canon James Cronin. The church is affiliated to Churches Together in Barnes. The parish is part of the Archdiocese of Southwark.

History
The church was built in 1958. The architect was Ronald Hardy.

Services and activities
Mass is held every morning and also on Saturday and Sunday evenings.

A mother and toddler group meets every Thursday morning during term time.

Education
The church has an affiliated primary school – St Osmund's Catholic Primary School – nearby at Church Road, Barnes.

References

External links
 Official website
 Taking-stock.org.uk – Architectural notes

1958 establishments in England
Castelnau, London
Churches in Barnes, London
Churches in the Diocese of Southwark
Roman Catholic churches completed in 1958
Roman Catholic churches in the London Borough of Richmond upon Thames